Deh Matun (also Romanized as Deh Mātūn; also known as Deh Mātān) is a village in Abnama Rural District, in the Central District of Rudan County, Hormozgan Province, Iran. At the 2006 census, its population was 330, in 77 families.

References 

Populated places in Rudan County